Clifford R. Goldstein (born in 1955) is an American author and editor. He is a leading figure in the Seventh-day Adventist denomination and espouses mainline Adventist beliefs.

Biography 
Goldstein was born in Albany, New York in the United States. He was raised a secular Jew, but became a Seventh-day Adventist  in 1980. He studied at Southern College and at Outpost Centers International. He received a B.A. from the University of Florida.

He edited the journal Shabbat Shalom from 1984 till 1992. In the early 90s, Goldstein interpreted the end of the Cold War as a new sign of the end of the world, with the end of the Soviet Union as the end of "the most implacable barrier to Adventist eschatology." He was a popular apocalyptic writer in the church at this time.

In 1992 he received a M.A. in Ancient Northwest Semitic languages from Johns Hopkins University. He was the editor of Liberty magazine from 1992 till 1997. He became the editor of the Adventist Adult Sabbath School Lesson in 1999. He wrote the 2006 third quarter (July to September) edition, entitled The Gospel, 1844, and Judgment, which upheld the traditional views of the 1844 investigative judgment and heavenly sanctuary teachings.

Goldstein and his wife Kimberly have two children.

Beliefs 
According to Goldstein he has never been a member of the Adventist Theological Society (ATS). However he has been described as one of the two "effective spokesmen for the ATS perspective", and "the most visible and vocal exponent of the ATS agenda".

He is known to espouse the belief that one cannot be an Adventist and an Evolutionist, a claim that some disagree with.

Publications 
 1844 Made Simple (1989) (publisher's page)
 Best Seller (1990), republished as The Clifford Goldstein Story (1996) (publisher's page), an autobiography
 How Dare You Judge Us, God (1991)
 False Balances (1992)
 A Pause for Peace: What God's Gift of the Sabbath Can Mean to You (1992)
 The Day of the Dragon (1993) (publisher's page). Excerpt "The Hypocrisy of the Adventist Left" reprinted in Adventist Today
 The Remnant: Biblical Reality or Wishful Thinking? (1994) (publisher's page)
 Between the Lamb and the Lion (1995)
 One Nation Under God? (1996)
 Children of the Promise (1997) (publisher's page)
 Like a Fire in My Bones (1998)
 By His Stripes (1999)
 The Day Evil Dies (1999) (publisher's page)
 The Great Compromise (2001) (publisher's page)
 God, Gödel, and Grace: A Philosophy of Faith (2003) (publisher's page)
 Graffiti in the Holy of Holies (2004) (publisher's page). Chapter 5: "The Gospel and the Judgment" and Chapter 7: "The Gift of Prophecy" reprinted on the Adventist Review website
 The Mules That Angels Ride (2005) (publisher's page)
 Life Without Limits (publisher's pages: normal version, deluxe version)

Touch Points tracts.

See also 

 Seventh-day Adventist Church
 Seventh-day Adventist theology
 Seventh-day Adventist eschatology
 History of the Seventh-day Adventist Church
 28 fundamental beliefs
 Questions on Doctrine
 Teachings of Ellen White
 Inspiration of Ellen White
 Prophecy in the Seventh-day Adventist Church
 Investigative judgment
 The Pillars of Adventism
 Second Advent
 Baptism by Immersion
 Conditional Immortality
 Historicism
 End times
 Ellen G. White

References

External links 
 Articles by Goldstein as cataloged in the Seventh-day Adventist Periodical Index (SDAPI)

1955 births
Living people
American Seventh-day Adventists
Jewish American writers
Converts to Adventism
Writers from Albany, New York
Seventh-day Adventist religious workers
Southern Adventist University alumni
Protestant writers